Henri Laaksonen was the defending champion but chose not to defend his title.

Attila Balázs won the title after defeating Aslan Karatsev 7–6(7–5), 0–6, 7–6(8–6) in the final.

Seeds
All seeds receive a bye into the second round.

Draw

Finals

Top half

Section 1

Section 2

Bottom half

Section 3

Section 4

References

External links
Main Draw
Qualifying Draw

Singles